Red King, in comics, may refer to:

 Red King (DC Comics), a DC Comics supervillain
Marvel Comics characters:
 Red King, a leading character in Planet Hulk
 Alan Wilson, a member of the London branch of the Hellfire Club, where the Red King rank is equivalent to the White King

 The Red King (webtoon)

See also
Red King (disambiguation)
Red Queen (comics)

References